Elena Konstantinova Murtazaeva (born 25 August 1981) is a Russian volleyball player.

She was part of the Russia women's national volleyball team at the 2002 FIVB Volleyball Women's World Championship in Germany.

On club level she played with CSKA.

Clubs

References

External links
 Elena Konstantinova at the International Volleyball Federation
 
 2012 CEV Volleyball Cup - Women (archive)
 

1981 births
Living people
Russian women's volleyball players
Place of birth missing (living people)
20th-century Russian women
21st-century Russian women